John Salmon Warburton (born 1903; date of death unknown) was an English professional footballer who played as an outside left. He made appearances in the English Football League for Wrexham and Crewe Alexandra. He also played for Rhyl, Bangor City, Mold, Macclesfield Town and Congleton Town during his career.

References

1903 births
Date of death unknown
English footballers
Association football midfielders
English Football League players
Rhyl F.C. players
Bangor City F.C. players
Wrexham A.F.C. players
Macclesfield Town F.C. players
Congleton Town F.C. players
Crewe Alexandra F.C. players